The Brasinca Uirapuru was a GT-class sports coupe manufactured in Brazil between 1964 and 1966. Only 77 examples of the model were ever made because of the high production costs.

History 
Originally named the 4200 GT, the Uirapuru was developed to showcase and promote the capabilities of Brasinca, who built trucks as well as stamped car parts for other manufacturers. 77 cars were made in total from 1964–1966, including three convertibles, when Brasinca shut it down due to high manufacturing costs.

The Uirapuru bears a strong resemblance to the Jensen Interceptor, which entered production the same year that Uirapuru production ended, with many saying that the Interceptor took styling cues from the Uirapuru.

Performance 
Unlike many other sports cars of its time that used fiberglass bodies, the Uirapuru had a hand built sheet steel body placed on a bespoke monoblock frame. The Uirapuru was also one of the first Brazilian cars to undergo wind tunnel testing in the Aeronautical Technological Institute (ITA), in São José dos Campos. The original 4200 GT was powered by a 6-cylinder 4271cc Chevrolet truck engine which used three SU carburetors and produced 155 hp.
The later 4200 S had 163 hp thanks to Iskenderian valve control  and the 4200 GTS had 170 hp. The 4200 GT accelerated from 0-100 kmh (0-62 mph) in 10.4 seconds and could reach a top speed of around 200 kmh (124 mph).

References

External links
 A comparison of the Brasinca Uirapuru and the Jensen Interceptor (video)
 Brasinca 4200 GT - Uirapuru
 Uirapuru history in Portuguese
 Uirapuru history in English (PDF)
Cars of Brazil
Cars introduced in 1964

Grand tourers